Omar Alejandro Flores Serrano (born 6 May 1979) is a Mexican former professional football defender who last played for Ballenas Galeana in the Ascenso MX.

Flores made his Mexican league debut for Atlas, on 11 March 2000 against Toluca.

References

External links

1979 births
Living people
Sportspeople from Acapulco
Footballers from Guerrero
Mexican footballers
Association football defenders
Atlas F.C. footballers
Club León footballers
Querétaro F.C. footballers
Chiapas F.C. footballers
Lobos BUAP footballers
Ballenas Galeana Morelos footballers
Liga MX players
Ascenso MX players